The Institute for Development of Freedom of Information (IDFI) - is a Georgian non-governmental organization which tends to support the development of an informed and empowered society for democratic governance. IDFI promotes human rights and good governance by raising civic awareness through sound informational reports, research and recommendations; Advocates for initiating & implementing reforms of policies, laws and practices to enhance democratic governance.

The organization was founded in 2009 by two historians/researchers Levan Avalishvili and Giorgi Kldiashvili.

History

The idea to create IDFI was born during an international conference that was periodically hosted by Levan Avalishvili and Giorgi Kldiashvili in Georgia since 2005. The conference was supported by the American non-governmental research organization National Security Archive, George Washington University. The conference involved participants, which included local and foreign historians, archive researchers, and specialists and lawyers in the fields of public access to information and open governance, discussing issues related to openness of archives and access to archival documents in various countries.

During the 2009 conference, an idea was born to set up an organization in Georgia that would advocate archive transparency by working on openness, transparency and improvement of access to public information. Eventually, with the help of American partners, Levan Avalishvili and Giorgi Kldiashvili established such an organization.

Initially, IDFI focused on watchdog activities. It monitored government activities, disclosed violations and informed the public.

Starting in 2012, IDFI gradually started to shift its focus from watchdog to think tank activities. Currently IDFI is as a hybrid watchdog/think-tank organization, combining monitoring and analytical skills with evidence based advocacy, strategic litigation, awareness raising and consulting activities as well as growing international impact.

Directions

Good governance

One of the key priorities of the organization is to develop open government principles, which includes increasing access to public information and use of open data; promoting citizen engagement in policy development and supporting substantial and innovative open government reforms in Georgia.

To improve the quality of access to public information, IDFI conducts monitoring, awareness raising and advocacy activities, in frames of which IDFI publishes reports, studies, organizes various types of events and communicates its recommendations with relevant public institutions and stakeholders. In addition, to promote the use of open data, IDFI develops innovative platforms and organizes various campaigns and activities.

IDFI is also actively engaged in promoting citizen participation in the decision-making, budgeting and lawmaking processes on both central and local government levels.

In addition, IDFI actively supports the implementation of the Open Governance Partnership (OGP) principles and activities in Georgia and beyond her borders. IDFI backs the execution of OGP principles on the Governmental, legislative, regional and local levels based with cooperation to the Administration of the Government of Georgia, Parliament of Georgia, Supreme Council of Ajara and local self-governing and civil society organizations.

Fighting Corruption

One of the priorities of the organization is the fight against corruption. To this end, IDFI is involved in the development of anticorruption policy, within which, once every two years, it submits to the Secretariat of the Anti-Corruption Council the evidence-based recommendations and the commitments to be undertaken by the agencies in the strategic documents. At the same time, IDFI monitors the implementation of anticorruption policy documents and submits its views on the implementation of commitments to the Secretariat.

Raising public awareness is important for the effective fight against corruption, therefore IDFI carries out educational activities including the Educational Certification Program in Fighting Corruption. At the same time, the organization periodically publishes awareness-raising videos, analyses of international indexes and evaluations, etc.

IDFI actively cooperates with international anticorruption institutions, such as the Anti-Corruption Network of the Organization for Economic Co-operation and Development (OECD-ACN), the Council of Europe Group of States against Corruption (GRECO), the Coalition of United Nations Convention against Corruption (UNCAC), the Eastern Partnership, etc.

Economic and social policy

IDFI is engaged in researching the social-economic policy and legislation in Georgia. The organization analyzes both Georgia’s development data and international best practice and, based on the latter, provides the Georgian government with recommendations on how to promote economic development and increase the level of wellbeing in Georgia.   
 
IDFI also works towards raising public awareness about the goals of Georgia’s social-economic development strategy and promoted citizen engagement in the process of its implementation. The organization monitors and evaluates the effectiveness of all of the major socio-economic programs run by the Georgian government.

Rule of Law and Human Rights

The activities within the scope of the rule of law and human rights direction are aimed at promoting independence, transparency, accountability and efficiency of the judiciary. The organization is actively involved in the process of monitoring and reforming the court system.

IDFI also aims to enhance human rights standards, improve the mechanisms for securing human rights and promote human rights-based approaches. Within the scope of this direction, the organization is also focused on improving transparency and accountability of the law enforcement system.

Local Government

One of the directions of IDFI is Local Government, which among other issues, aims to facilitate the decentralization process through:

- Expanding the powers /competences of local self-government public institutions to resolve local problems;

- Increasing transparency, accountability and effectiveness of municipalities;

- Advancing financial and institutional capacity of municipalities to perform their functions properly.

To this end, IDFI a) conducts monitoring of the implementation of local government and decentralization strategies and action plans; b) facilitates dialogue and experience sharing between central and local governments; c) advocates for the improvement of legislation and practice of access to municipal data, and standards for proactive disclosure of public data in municipalities; d) supports the improvement of quality of municipal service delivery through new technologies, best practices and user-centered design/approaches and e) increases capacity of local stakeholders.

Media and Freedom of Expression

The main goals of the Media and Freedom of Expression Direction are to support the activities of media organizations and journalists in Georgia, to monitor the legislation regulating freedom of expression and related legislation, and to develop the relevant caselaw.

To achieve its goals and improve the existing standards for protection of media and freedom of expression, IDFI actively cooperates with media representatives and other stakeholders. In addition, IDFI conducts strategic litigation and targeted legal aid program.

Internet and Innovations

IDF has several specific objectives under its Internet and Innovations Direction: Promote efficient and effective e-governance ecosystem in Georgia; Promote effective, efficient and ethical use of innovative technologies (including Algorithms and artificial intelligence); Raise media and digital literacy; Increase access to the Internet and ensure digital freedoms.

To this end, IDFI periodically publishes different types of publications and policy recommendations on Internet and digital rights-related challenges and the ways to deal with them in Georgia and beyond.  In addition to research and policy analysis, IDFI conducts awareness raising campaigns and educational programs regarding the use of new technologies among various target groups.

Memory and disinformation studies

 IDFI is working towards exposing and debunking the effects of propaganda and disinformation that go against Georgia’s strategic goals regarding the integration with NATO and the EU. IDFI regularly publishes articles, analytical papers, policy papers and briefs that are aimed at, on the one hand, informing the society about propaganda and, on the other hand, providing recommendations to the government about how to deal with this problem.  

For the purpose of combating propaganda, IDFI is collaborating with government agencies, partner local and international organizations, educational and academic institutions.

With the aim to help the country build a democratic future, IDFI analyzes academic and archival documents in order to contribute to the study of Georgia’s recent history- the Soviet past. IDFI works on opening the Sovietepoch archives and make archival documents available to the public.

IDFI is also actively involved in identifying the victims of Soviet repressions and is helping their families with legal disputes.  The organization aims to research and preserve memory of the past, and to inform the population about the crimes of the totalitarian regime.

Significant achievements

 IDFI was elected as the Co-Chair of Open Government Georgia Forum.
 IDFI was elected as the Co-Chair of the Working Group at the Inter-Governmental Anti-Corruption Council.
 Open Government Georgia Action Plans were developed with the direct participation of IDFI.
 The list of public information to be disclosed proactively was created with participation of IDFI.
 IDFI was actively involved in drafting of a new law on Freedom of Information. The Government of Georgia adopted the Decree on Electronic Requests and Proactive Disclosure of Public Information.
 As a result of advocacy and support from IDFI, the Georgian Parliament has joined the Open Government Partnership (OGP).
 IDFI was granted the highest score in transparency by Transparify. 
 Access to public information has improved as a result of monitoring and advocacy by IDFI since 2010.
 IDFI’s studies have revealed corruption deals, cases of nepotism, abuse of authority, unreasonable spending of budget funds and other cases of violation of the law.
 The government portal for open data – www.data.gov.ge was created with direct recommendations of IDFI.
 IDFI has created the concept of e-petitions – www.ichange.ge, which the government committed to implement within the framework of OGP.
 As a result of advocacy from IDFI, the National Security Council has joined the provisions of proactive disclosure of public information.
 As a result of recommendations from IDFI, the Law on the Protection of Whistleblowers has been enhanced.
 IDFI’s recommendations were taken into account in the new Labor Code.
 IDFI’s recommendations were taken into account in the new Law on Civil Service.
 The Georgian Government took into account IDFI’s recommendations concerning the strategy of digital broadcasting switchover.
 The data and studies prepared by IDFI were included in the Country Reports on Human Rights Practices by U.S Department of State, the reports of Freedom House and other international reports and ratings. 
 IDFI’s monitoring and advocacy work has resulted in Georgia’s improved ranking in the E-Government Development Index (UN).
 The Archive of the former Committee of State Security (KGB) of Georgia was declassified, modernized and digitized.
 Through IDFI’s advocacy and recommendations, access to and unrestricted use of the Internet was recognized as a fundamental right of the citizens of Georgia.
 IDFI created the Transparent Public Procurement Rating – www.tpp-rating.org, the only global initiative devoted solely to the study of public procurement transparency across the world.
 IDFI made significant contributions to the process the nationalization of Sustainable Development Goals’ (SDGs) in Georgia.
 Due to IDFI’s efforts, several municipalities have approved and are implementing evidence-based Transparency and Integrity Strategies and Action Plans. 
 IDFI and its partner organizations created a national mechanism for assessing transparency and accountability of Georgia’s municipalities – Local Self-Government Index.
 IDFI created websites for over 20 municipalities throughout the country equipped with various tools for communication with and engagement of citizens.
 IDFI is the leading CSO in Georgia to start alternative monitoring of the Public Administration Reform (PAR). 
 The shortcomings identified and recommendations provided by the PAR alternative monitoring reports, prepared by IDFI, were recognized by the Government Administration, which vowed to improve the next PAR strategy and action plan.
 As a result of IDFI’s activities, the Prosecutor General’s Office recognized the need to improve its Strategy and Action Plan and started working to update the documents. 
 The 2017-2018 monitoring report  on the implementation of its Strategy and Action Plan by the Prosecution Service of Georgia (PSG),  prepared by IDFI, was the first report to be published on the issue and to be publicly discussed with the involvement of the PSG representatives.

Coalitions

 Georgian Civil Society National Platform for the Eastern Partnership
 Open Government Georgia Forum
 Intergovernmental Anti-Corruption Council
 Coalition for an Independent and Transparent Judiciary
 Media Advocacy Coalition
 Open Parliament Georgia Working Group
 Eurasian Academic Anti-Corruption Network (EAACN)
 Global Data Barometer (GDB)
 International Coalition of Sites of Conscience
 The Freedom of Information Advocates Network (FOIAnet)
 Information Integrity Coalition

Financial support

Institute for Development of Freedom of Information (IDFI) gets funding from various sources, such as international funds, governments of foreign countries, international and/or local organizations and institutions, private companies and individuals. IDFI accepts funding, only if its purpose is in line with organization’s vision and objectives, and does not negatively affect IDFI’s reputation and independence.
The financial support of IDFI is fully transparent and all details can be found on our webpage. In 2015, 2016 and 2018, IDFI was listed among the most transparent Think Tank organizations in the world - receiving the 5 Star Award - by Transparify.

In 2018-2021, IDFI was certified as equivalent to a U.S. public charity by NGOsource. The unique NGOsource ED repository allows US-based grantmakers to access IDFI’s existing legal analysis and ED certificate and issue grants to the organization with simplified procedures.

External links

Online Monitoring Platform of the Public Administration Reform – www.partracker.ge 
Public Information Database – www.foi.idfi.ge 
Judicial Statistics – www.idfi.ge/ge/courtstat
Public Information Database – www.opendata.ge 
Database of FOI officers
Visualization of the declared wage incomes of the State Officials
Webpage for internet freedom
Rating of Monitoring of Information (Internet) Resources of Public Authorities
Statistics of FOI requests
Module of the Court Statistics 
Project about independence of Georgia
Open Government Partnership Georgia
Local Self-Government index-lsgindex
Development of e-Participation in Georgia
Public Procurement rating

Political organisations based in Georgia (country)
2009 establishments in Georgia (country)